Fernando Di Leo (11 January 1932 – 2 December 2003) was an Italian film director and script writer. He made 17 films as a director and about 50 scripts from 1964 to 1985.

Biography
Fernando Di Leo was born on 11 January 1932 in San Ferdinando di Puglia. After briefly working in a Rome's film school Centro Sperimentale di Cinematografia, di Leo made his debut as a director as part of the omnibus comedy Gli eroi di ieri, oggi, domani with his episode titled Un posto in paradiso. Following this Di Leo wrote several scripts for Westerns, often uncredited. This included work on A Fistful of Dollars and For a Few Dollars More. Some of his Westerns had uncredited literary sources, such as Days of Vengeance which as loosely based on Alexandre Dumas' The Count of Monte Cristo.

Di Leo was a fan of film noir and wanted to make an Italian version of these films. Among his first efforts was the script for Mino Guerrini's Date for a Murder based on Franco Enna's novel Tempo di massacro written in 1955. In Di Leo's version, the setting is moved to a contemporary Rome and has elements of contemporary spy films. Di Leo worked with Guerrini again on the film Gangsters '70 which did not do well in the box office. Di Leo began directing more of his own films at the time including the war film Red Roses for the Fuhrer and a few erotic films: A Woman on Fire, A Wrong Way to Love and Seduction. From 1969 to 1976, di Leo was able to produce many of his own works with his production company Duania cineproduzioni 70. He followed this with a return to noir with Naked Violence, a film adapting a novel by Giorgio Scerbanenco, a writer who Di Leo would adapt for several future film productions.

Di Leo would make a giallo film with Slaughter Hotel starring Klaus Kinski and Margaret Lee. Following this Di Leo worked on Caliber 9 and The Italian Connection which were both inspired by the writing of Scerbanenco. He followed up this film Il Boss, a film which got Di Leo in trouble with politicians and authorities due to the films display connections between the mafia and the Italy's major party Democrazia Cristiana. Di Leo followed this up with Shoot First, Die Later in 1974. Di Leo worked through the latter half of the 1970's directing Mister Scarface, Kidnap Syndicate, and Nick the Sting. He also wrote scripts for other directors such as Romolo Guerrieri's Young, Violent, Dangerous and Ruggero Deodato's Live Like a Cop, Die Like a Man. Di Leo's last film produced by his company Duania cineproduzioni 70 was Rulers of the City in 1976. He continued with a few more films after with the film noir Blood and Diamonds, the erotic drama To Be Twenty - both in 1978, and Madness in 1980.

Di Leo worked in television in the 1980's, starting with the television series L'assassino ha le ore contate, which involved six one-hour long made-for-TV films produced by RAI Uno which as of 2013 are unreleased. Di Leo also made The Violent Breed and his last film Killer vs. Killers towards the mid-1980's. Killer vs. Killers wasn't released theatrically in Italy and only surfaced 20 years later on DVD.

Di Leo died in December 2003.

Select filmography

References

Bibliography

External links
Official website

1932 births
2003 deaths
Italian film directors
Poliziotteschi directors
People from the Province of Barletta-Andria-Trani
Male Spaghetti Western actors